Van Creek is a stream in the U.S. state of Georgia. It is a tributary to the Savannah River.

A variant name is "Vans Creek". Van Creek took its name from  Van's Church, which in turn was named after David Van, a pioneer citizen.

References

Rivers of Georgia (U.S. state)
Rivers of Elbert County, Georgia